Balasan, officially the Municipality of Balasan,  is a 4th class municipality in the province of Iloilo, Philippines. According to the 2020 census, it has a population of 35,064 people.

The business and shopping centre of northern Iloilo, Balasan is a compact town and easy to get around on foot, by bicycle, or by public transport.

Buses arrive at Balasan bus station, a kilometre to the Balasan's town centre, every fifteen minutes. Taking a tricycle is the most convenient way for newcomers to travel around Balasan.

In 1950, the barrio of Zarragoza was transferred from the town of Batad.

Etymology
Balasan derived its name from "Balas" meaning sand which are still found in abundance along the Banks of Bangon River where the first settlement was founded.

History
Sometime in 1846, Francisco Ariola, son of the datu from Jolo, together with his men, found themselves in the shores of Carles. He immediately organized the early settlers who later mingled with his men at Punta Bulakawe, a plateau just 330 meters north of the Poblacion (town proper). The settlers extended their clearing up the jungles and virgin lands for development. The Provincial Governor of Capiz commissioned Ariola to facilitate transportation of families recruited from Antique and Aklan. Soon afterwards, more settlers came. The Punta Bulakawe settlement, thus formed was included under the Pueblo de Pilar, Capiz.

It was in 1857 when Don Juan Silverio granted Francisco Ariola permission together with 50 families to go in a boat southeastwards from Barrio Sumagbong Cogon, Nabas, Capiz (Aklan) to the unfamiliar lands in the eastern portions of Panay Island. They soon landed in what was then known to be Punta Bulukawe, Capiz (Punta Badaiang, Carles). They were granted a full tax exemption for three years if they cultivated the new land.

Towards 1856, as the general clearing progressed, Francisco transferred Bulakawe to the lowland south of the settlement. The settlement was named BADIANG, which means "wild giant gabi variety" because of the abundance of this plant in the vicinity of the new site. As streets were laid out Ariola, caused the equal distribution of the home lots to settlers alongside the new created streets. Some settlers however, built their homes near farms. This later led to the formation of other barrio settlements.

After making a settlement, Francisco Ariola quickly appointed an exploration team to survey the new land further south. The team was led by Vicente Navales-the existing perpetual index of the leaders of Balasan started with the first teniente del barrio absolute, Vicente Navales in 1852.  They immediately set forth southeastward to a river where they rested for the night. The morning was when the river got its name when the first man to awaken called out: ‘Bangon!’ which meant ‘Arise!’ The land after the river was a beautiful grassland full of sparrows – probably the Paser montanus (maya bongol), Lochura malacca (maya pula), or the Padda oryzivora (maya costa) which was from which the place got its name, Maya. They went further off to such places which are now known as Barangay Bulac, Batad, and Lanubo (Estancia). After being gone for quite some time, the folks in the settlement began to worry so a search party was formed to bring them back. They met with the former party in a place which was from then on known to be Tabuan (a place where people meet). 
The accounts of Vicente Navales made some of the folks decide to make a sister-settlement in Maya. The place did prove promising and it expanded northeastward to a place with a river which was very ideal as a channel for sea trade and source of industrial sand (baras).   The place was from then until such a time was known as Barasan. It eventually expanded and soon such area which was once the extension of the maya settlement became known until now as Mamhut.

In January 1860, the leaders of the Barrio Badiang headed by Francisco Ariola went to Capiz to petition the provincial government to make Barrio Badiang a municipality. The governor denied the petition on the ground that Barrio Badiang was only newly created and was not yet capable of becoming a pueblo. Not discouraged by their first failure, the petitioners traveled for days to Iloilo City, to bring this petition to Governor Jose Maria Carles, a Spanish Governor. After studying the case, Governor Carles approved the petition and thus, Barrio Badiang became a "pueblo".

The jubilant people of Badiang, in gratitude to Governor Carles for his approval of this petition, presented another petition to change the name Badiang to Carles in honor of the Governor. This petition was approved and on July 1, 1862, Carles was inaugurated as a new Pueblo with Alenjandro Buaya as the first Gobernadorcillo del Pueblo made Carles.

On January 1, 1904, the Municipio de Carles was demoted from a status of a Barrio to the status of a Barrio Balasan. This incident disheartened some Carleseños who migrated to other towns and provinces. But among those who stayed on were the strong willed ones who struggled hard to make Carles an independent municipality. Headed by Casimiro Andrada, the Carles Separation Movement succeeded in getting the approval of the Carleseños petition for separation from Balasan on January 1, 1920.

The records show that former Badiang (Carles) then later known as Balasan became large enough that it even covered the areas which now are separate districts such as Carles, Balasan, Estancia, and Batad.

The writings of Douglas Malunda tell about a treasure that the settlers of Ariola stored in one wooden chest to make it easier to protect from thieves from both land and sea. It was said such chest of silver, gold and pearls was buried in a dried well somewhere in Balasan with only a large tree to mark its location. The most accurate knowledge of its location was known by Ariola's only son who unfortunately became one of the casualties of a cholera epidemic. With his death, the knowledge of the location of the treasure vanished. As yet, the treasure awaits its very fortunate hunter.

Geography

Barangays
Balasan is politically subdivided into 23 barangays.

Climate

Demographics

Economy

Healthcare
The town has two hospitals: Jesus M Colmenares District Hospital (government-owned, bed capacity 283) and Loida Sterner Hospital Facility (privately owned by a foundation, bed capacity about 100); and a Diagnostic centers: Medicus and Health Link.

References

External links

 [ Philippine Standard Geographic Code]
 Philippine Census Information
 Local Governance Performance Management System

Municipalities of Iloilo